Cyril Thomas Edmunds  (24 October 1925 – 2 February 2003) was an Australian politician.

He was born in Essendon to plumber Cyril Edmunds and Gertrude Victoria Jeffreys. He attended local state schools and served in the Royal Australian Air Force from 1943 to 1945, as a coxswain in the South Pacific Air Sea Rescue Service. On his return he became a lithographer, managing a printing factory. On 14 June 1952 he married Vivienne Amy Ballantine; they had three children. In 1952 he joined the Labor Party, and held several local offices. In 1967 he was elected to the Victorian Legislative Assembly as the member for Moonee Ponds; he would serve until 1988, transferring to Ascot Vale in 1976 and Pascoe Vale in 1988. He was Opposition spokesman on housing and planning from 1972 to 1977 and on police and emergency services from 1977 to 1982, as well as Opposition whip from 1976 to 1979 and from 1980 to 1982. When Labor won government in 1982 he was elected Speaker, serving until his retirement from politics in 1988. The following year he was appointed a Member of the Order of Australia.

References

1925 births
2003 deaths
Australian Labor Party members of the Parliament of Victoria
Members of the Victorian Legislative Assembly
Speakers of the Victorian Legislative Assembly
Members of the Order of Australia
20th-century Australian politicians
Royal Australian Air Force personnel of World War II
Royal Australian Air Force airmen
Military personnel from Melbourne
People from Essendon, Victoria
Politicians from Melbourne